Hypena ophiusoides is a moth in the family Erebidae first described by Frederic Moore in 1882. It is found in Taiwan.

References

Moths described in 1882
ophiusoides
Moths of Asia